is an actress and model. Her agency is Stardust Promotion.

Filmography

TV 
  Aikurushii -  (2005)
  Be with You -　 (2005)
  One Night R&R (ワンナイR&R) - (2005 - 2006)
  1 Litre no Namida -  (2006)
  Kinyō Entertainment (金曜エンタテイメント) -  (2006)
  Purimadamu (プリマダム) -  (2006)
  Kinyō Entertainment (金曜エンタテイメント) -  (2006)
  Tokyo Girls - Path of short film  (東京少女 ショートフィルム道) -  (2006)
  Koisuru nichiyōbi 3rd Series (恋する日曜日 第3シリーズ) -  (2007)
  Kinyō Prestige (金曜プレステージ) -  (2007)
  Thrill night - kosodate no tensai (スリルな夜・子育ての天才) -  (2007)
  Doyō Wide Theater - Law firm of Yumiko Benten  1 ''' (土曜ワイド劇場 弁天祐美子法律事務所 1) -  (2007)
  Sensei dō - Pistol sensei (先生道 - ピストル先生) -  (2007)
  Half a Confession -  (2007)
  Tokyo Girls - Nanami Sakuraba (東京少女 桜庭ななみ) -  (2008)
  Kinyō Prestige (金曜プレステージ) -  (2008)
  Tokyo Girls - Azusa Okamoto (東京少女 岡本あずさ) -  (2008)
  Zeni Geba (銭ゲバ) -  (2009)
  Next -  (2009)
  Otomen - Summer -  (2009)
  Otomen - Autumn -  (2009)
  Doyō Wide Theater - Law firm of Yumiko Benten  2  (土曜ワイド劇場 弁天祐美子法律事務所 2) -  (2009)
  The Wallflower  -  (2010)
  Zettai Reido -  (2010)
  Moteki -  (2010)
  Lady - Last crime profile (LADY〜最後の犯罪プロファイル〜) -  (2011)
  Kamen Rider Fourze -  (2011 - 2012)
  Strawberry Night (ストロベリーナイト) -  (2012)
 Resident: Gonin no kenshuui (レジデント〜5人の研修医) -  (2012)
 Miyuki Miyabe mystery - Perfect Blue (宮部みゆきミステリー パーフェクト・ブルー) -  (2012)
 Switch Girl 2 (スイッチガール!!2) -  (2012)
 Otomesan (おトメさん) -  (2013)
 Shuden Byebye (終電バイバイ) -  (2013)
 Seventeen killer (セブンティーンキラー) -  (2013)
 Suiyō Mystery 9 - Writer of detective・Misa Yamamura 3 (水曜ミステリー9 作家探偵・山村美紗3) -  (2013)
 No coin・Kid 〜History of our game〜 (ノーコン・キッド 〜ぼくらのゲーム史〜) (2013)
 Giga Tokyo Toy Box (大東京トイボックス) -  (2014)

Net movies
  Blizzard (ブリザード) -  (2011)
  Kamen Rider × Super Sentai: Super Hero Taihen -  (2012)
  Kamen Rider Fourze: Everyone, Class Is Here! -  (2012)

Movies
  Kazuo Umezu Horror Movie - Girl of the plaque (楳図かずおの恐怖劇場 「まだらの少女」) -  (2005)
  Hontou ni Atta Kowai Hanashi 3D - shisen (ほんとうにあった怖い話3D「シセン」) -  (2010)
  Gyakuten no Cinderella (逆転のシンデレラ) -  (2010)
  Kamen Rider × Kamen Rider Fourze & OOO: Movie War Mega Max -  (2011)
  Kamen Rider × Super Sentai: Super Hero Taisen -  (2012)
  Kamen Rider Fourze the Movie: Everyone, Space Is Here! -  (2012)
  Kamen Rider × Kamen Rider Wizard & Fourze: Movie War Ultimatum -  (2012)
  Minasan Sayounara (みなさん、さようなら) (2013)
  Toshiue no Hito (年上ノ彼女) -  (2014)

Radio
  Bakumatsu Sanshimai (幕末三姉妹) -  (2011)

Music videos
  Brahman -  "A White Deep Morning" (2004)
  GReeeeN - "Aiuta" (2007)
   - "Kimi ni Todoke" (2009)
  GReeeeN - "Tabibito" (2010)
  Universe - "Echoes" (2010)
  Daigo - "Ima Aitakute..." (2013)

Works
 DVD 
  Tokyo Girls - Nanami Sakuraba (東京少女 桜庭ななみ) (2009)
  GReeeeN - 《これ、ＰＶでＳＨＯＷっ！！？？》 (2009)
  Otomen - Summer (オトメン(乙男)〜夏〜) (2009)
  Otomen - Autumn (オトメン(乙男)〜秋〜) (2009)
  Kamen Rider Fourze DVD＆Blu-ray (2012)
 Shiho no koto (志保のこと) (2012)
 Toshiue no Hito (年上ノ彼女) (2014)

 Books 
 Photo-book《SHIHO》'' (志保) (2012)

References

External links
 Stardust Promotion official website 
 Stardust U-23 Under twenty three special interview 
 OCN TODAY トップ - 今日の美少女写真 Vol.47

1992 births
Living people
Japanese film actresses
People from Gunma Prefecture
Stardust Promotion artists